The leopard (Panthera pardus) is one of the five extant species in the genus Panthera, a member of the cat family, Felidae. It occurs in a wide range in sub-Saharan Africa, in some parts of Western and Central Asia, Southern Russia, and on the Indian subcontinent to Southeast and East Asia. It is listed as Vulnerable on the IUCN Red List because leopard populations are threatened by habitat loss and fragmentation, and are declining in large parts of the global range. The leopard is considered locally extinct in Hong Kong, Singapore, South Korea, Jordan, Morocco, Togo, the United Arab Emirates, Uzbekistan, Lebanon, Mauritania, Kuwait, Syria, Libya, Tunisia and most likely in North Korea, Gambia, Laos, Lesotho, Tajikistan, Vietnam and Israel.
Contemporary records suggest that the leopard occurs in only 25% of its historical global range.

Compared to other wild cats, the leopard has relatively short legs and a long body with a large skull. Its fur is marked with rosettes. It is similar in appearance to the jaguar (Panthera onca), but has a smaller, lighter physique, and its rosettes are generally smaller, more densely packed and without central spots. Both leopards and jaguars that are melanistic are known as black panthers. The leopard is distinguished by its well-camouflaged fur, opportunistic hunting behaviour, broad diet, strength, and its ability to adapt to a variety of habitats ranging from rainforest to steppe, including arid and montane areas. The earliest known leopard fossils excavated in Europe are estimated 600,000 years old, dating to the late Early Pleistocene. Leopard fossils have also been found in Sumatra, Taiwan and Japan.

Etymology
The word λέοπάρδος originally referred to a cheetah (Acinonyx jubatus).

Pardus is the masculine singular form.

Characteristics

The leopard's fur is generally soft and thick, notably softer on the belly than on the back. Its skin colour varies between individuals from pale yellowish to dark golden with dark spots grouped in rosettes. Its belly is whitish and its ringed tail is shorter than its body. Its pupils are round. Leopards living in arid regions are pale cream, yellowish to ochraceous and rufous in colour; those living in forests and mountains are much darker and deep golden. Spots fade toward the white underbelly and the insides and lower parts of the legs. Rosettes are circular in East African leopard populations, and tend to be squarish in Southern African and larger in Asian leopard populations. The fur tends to be grayish in colder climates, and dark golden in rain forest habitats. The pattern of the rosettes is unique in each individual. This pattern is thought to be an adaptation to dense vegetation with patchy shadows, where it serves as camouflage.

Juveniles have woolly fur, and appear to be dark-coloured due to the densely arranged spots. 
Its fur tends to grow longer in colder climates.
The leopard's rosettes differ from those of the jaguar (Panthera onca), which are darker and with smaller spots inside.

The leopard has a diploid chromosome number of 38.
The chromosomes include four acrocentric, five metacentric, seven submetacentric and two telocentric pairs.

Size
The leopard is sexually dimorphic with males larger and heavier than females. It is slender and muscular, with relatively short limbs and a broad head. Sizes vary geographically. Males weigh typically , and females . Leopards from the Cape Province in South Africa are generally smaller, reaching only  in males.
It measured .

Variant colouration

Melanistic leopards are also called black panthers. Melanism in leopards is caused by a recessive allele and inherited as a recessive trait. Interbreeding in melanistic leopards produces a significantly smaller litter size than is produced by normal pairings.
The black leopard is common foremost in tropical and subtropical moist forests like the equatorial rainforest of the Malay Peninsula and the tropical rainforest on the slopes of some African mountains such as Mount Kenya.
Between January 1996 and March 2009, leopards were photographed at 16 sites in the Malay Peninsula in a sampling effort of more than 1,000 camera trap nights. Of the 445 photographs of melanistic leopards, 410 were taken in study sites south of the Kra Isthmus, where the non-melanistic morph was never photographed. These data indicate the near-fixation of the dark allele in the region. The expected time for the fixation of this recessive allele due to genetic drift alone ranged from about 1,100 years to about 100,000 years. Pseudomelanistic leopards have also been reported.

In India, nine pale and white leopards were reported between 1905 and 1967.
Leopards exhibiting erythrism were recorded between 1990 and 2015 in South Africa's Madikwe Game Reserve and in Mpumalanga. The cause of this morph known as a "strawberry leopard" or "pink panther" is not well understood.

Taxonomy

Felis pardus was the scientific name proposed by Carl Linnaeus in 1758.
The generic name Panthera was first used by Lorenz Oken in 1816, who included all the known spotted cats into this group.
Oken's classification was not widely accepted, and Felis or Leopardus was used as the generic name until the early 20th century.

The leopard was designated as the type species of Panthera by Joel Asaph Allen in 1902.
In 1917, Reginald Innes Pocock also subordinated the tiger (P. tigris), lion (P. leo), and jaguar (P. onca) to Panthera.

Living subspecies
Following Linnaeus' first description, 27 leopard subspecies were proposed by naturalists between 1794 and 1956. Since 1996, only eight subspecies have been considered valid on the basis of mitochondrial analysis. Later analysis revealed a ninth valid subspecies, the Arabian leopard.

In 2017, the Cat Classification Task Force of the Cat Specialist Group recognized the following eight subspecies as valid taxa:

Results of an analysis of molecular variance and pairwise fixation index of 182 African leopard museum specimens showed that some African leopards exhibit higher genetic differences than Asian leopard subspecies.

Evolution

The leopard is a sister taxon to a clade within Panthera, consisting of the lion and the jaguar.

Results of a phylogenetic analysis of chemical secretions amongst cats indicated that the leopard is closely related to the lion.
The geographic origin of the Panthera is most likely northern Central Asia. The leopard-lion clade was distributed in the Asian and African Palearctic since at least the early Pliocene. The leopard-lion clade diverged 3.1–1.95 million years ago. Additionally, a 2016 study revealed that the mitochondrial genomes of the leopard, lion and snow leopard are more similar to each other than their nuclear genomes, indicating that their ancestors hybridized with the snow leopard at some point in their evolution.

Fossil cat teeth collected in Sumatra's Padang Highlands were assigned to the leopard. It has since been hypothesized that it became extirpated on the island due to the Toba eruption about 75,000 years ago, and due to competition with the Sunda clouded leopard (Neofelis diardi) and the dhole (Cuon alpinus).

In Europe, the leopard occurred at least since the Pleistocene. Leopard-like fossil bones and teeth possibly dating to the Pliocene were excavated in Perrier in France, northeast of London, and in Valdarno, Italy. Until 1940, similar fossils dating back to the Pleistocene were excavated mostly in loess and caves at 40 sites in Europe, including Furninha Cave near Lisbon, Genista Caves in Gibraltar, and Santander Province in northern Spain to several sites across France, Switzerland, Italy, Austria, Germany, in the north up to Derby in England, in the east to Přerov in the Czech Republic and the Baranya in southern Hungary, Leopard fossils dating to the Late Pleistocene were found in Biśnik Cave in south-central Poland. The oldest known leopard fossils excavated in Europe are about 600,000 years old and were found in the Grotte du Vallonnet in France and near Mauer in Germany. Four European Pleistocene leopard subspecies were proposed. The most recent, P. p. spelaea, appeared at the beginning of the Late Pleistocene and survived until about 24,000 years ago in several parts of Europe. Leopard fossils dating to the Pleistocene were also excavated in the Japanese archipelago.

Hybrids

In 1953, a male leopard and a lioness were crossbred in Hanshin Park in Nishinomiya, Japan. Their offspring known as a leopon was born in 1959 and 1961, all cubs were spotted and bigger than a juvenile leopard. Attempts to mate a leopon with a tigress were unsuccessful.

Distribution and habitat 

The leopard has the largest distribution of all wild cats, occurring widely in Africa, the Caucasus and Asia, although populations are fragmented and declining. It is considered to be extirpated in North Africa. It inhabits foremost savanna and rainforest, and areas where grasslands, woodlands, and riverine forests remain largely undisturbed. In sub-Saharan Africa, it is still numerous and surviving in marginal habitats where other large cats have disappeared. There is considerable potential for human-leopard conflict due to leopards preying on livestock.

Leopard populations on the Arabian Peninsula are small and fragmented. In southeastern Egypt, a leopard killed in 2017 was the first record in this area in 65 years.
In western and central Asia, it avoids deserts, areas with long snow cover and proximity to urban centres.

In the Indian subcontinent, the leopard is still relatively abundant, with greater numbers than those of other Panthera species. As of 2020, the leopard population within forested habitats in India's tiger range landscapes was estimated at 12,172 to 13,535 individuals. Surveyed landscapes included elevations below   in the Shivalik Hills and Gangetic plains, Central India and Eastern Ghats, Western Ghats, the Brahmaputra River basin and hills in Northeast India. Some leopard populations in the country live quite close to human settlements and even in semi-developed areas. Although adaptable to human disturbances, leopards require healthy prey populations and appropriate vegetative cover for hunting for prolonged survival and thus rarely linger in heavily developed areas. Due to the leopard's stealth, people often remain unaware that it lives in nearby areas.

In Sri Lanka, leopards were recorded in Yala National Park and in unprotected forest patches, tea estates, grasslands, home gardens, pine and eucalyptus plantations.
In Myanmar, leopards were recorded for the first time by camera traps in the hill forests of Myanmar's Karen State. The Northern Tenasserim Forest Complex in southern Myanmar is considered a leopard stronghold. In Thailand, leopards are present in the Western Forest Complex, Kaeng Krachan-Kui Buri, Khlong Saeng-Khao Sok protected area complexes and in Hala Bala Wildlife Sanctuary bordering Malaysia. In Peninsular Malaysia, leopards are present in Belum-Temengor, Taman Negara and Endau-Rompin National Parks.
In Laos, leopards were recorded in Nam Et-Phou Louey National Biodiversity Conservation Area and Nam Kan National Protected Area.
In Cambodia, leopards inhabit deciduous dipterocarp forest in Phnom Prich Wildlife Sanctuary and Mondulkiri Protected Forest.
In southern China, leopards were recorded only in the Qinling Mountains during surveys in 11 nature reserves between 2002 and 2009.

Outside protected areas, leopards were recorded in mixed agricultural land, secondary forest and production forest between 2008 and 2014.

Behaviour and ecology 

The leopard is a solitary and territorial animal. It is typically shy and alert when crossing roadways and encountering oncoming vehicles, but may be emboldened to attack people or other animals when threatened. Adults associate only in the mating season. Females continue to interact with their offspring even after weaning and have been observed sharing kills with their offspring when they can not obtain any prey. They produce a number of vocalizations, including growls, snarls, meows, and purrs. The roaring sequence in leopards consists mainly of grunts, also called "sawing", as it resembles the sound of sawing wood. Cubs call their mother with a urr-urr sound.

The whitish spots on the back of its ears are thought to play a role in communication.
It has been hypothesized that the white tips of their tails may function as a 'follow-me' signal in intraspecific communication. However, no significant association were found between a conspicuous colour of tail patches and behavioural variables in carnivores.

Leopards are active mainly from dusk till dawn and rest for most of the day and for some hours at night in thickets, among rocks or over tree branches. In some regions, they are nocturnal. In western African forests, they have been observed to be largely diurnal and hunting during twilight, when their prey animals are active; activity patterns vary between seasons.

Leopards can climb trees very skilfully, often rest on tree branches and descend from trees headfirst.

Social spacing
Males interact with their partners and cubs at times, and exceptionally this can extend beyond to two generations. Aggressive encounters are rare, typically limited to defending territories from intruders. In a South African reserve, a male was wounded in a male–male territorial battle over a carcass.

Males occupy home ranges that often overlap with a few smaller female home ranges, probably as a strategy to enhance access to females. In the Ivory Coast, the home range of a female was completely enclosed within a male's. Females live with their cubs in home ranges that overlap extensively, probably due to the association between mothers and their offspring. There may be a few other fluctuating home ranges belonging to young individuals. It is not clear if male home ranges overlap as much as those of females do. Individuals try to drive away intruders of the same sex.

A study of leopards in the Namibian farmlands showed that the size of home ranges was not significantly affected by sex, rainfall patterns or season; the higher the prey availability in an area, the greater the leopard population density and the smaller the size of home ranges, but they tend to expand if there is human interference.
Sizes of home ranges vary geographically and depending on habitat and availability of prey. They are even larger in arid and montane areas.

Hunting and diet 
Prey species in this weight range tend to occur in dense habitat and to form small herds. Species that prefer open areas and have well-developed anti-predator strategies are less preferred. More than 100 prey species have been recorded. The most preferred species are ungulates, such as impala (Aepyceros melampus), bushbuck (Tragelaphus scriptus), common duiker (Sylvicapra grimmia) and chital (Axis axis). Primates preyed upon include white-eyelid mangabeys (Cercocebus sp.), guenons (Cercopithecus sp.) and gray langurs (Semnopithecus sp.). Leopards also kill smaller carnivores like black-backed jackal (Lupulella mesomelas), bat-eared fox (Otocyon megalotis), genet (Genetta sp.) and cheetah. 

The largest prey killed by a leopard was reportedly a male eland weighing . A study in Wolong National Nature Reserve in southern China demonstrated variation in the leopard's diet over time; over the course of seven years, the vegetative cover receded, and leopards opportunistically shifted from primarily consuming tufted deer (Elaphodus cephalophus) to pursuing bamboo rats (Rhizomys sinense) and other smaller prey.

The leopard depends mainly on its acute senses of hearing and vision for hunting. It primarily hunts at night in most areas. In western African forests and Tsavo National Park, they have also been observed hunting by day. They usually hunt on the ground. In the Serengeti, they have been observed to ambush prey by jumping down on it from trees.

The animal stalks its prey and tries to approach as closely as possible, typically within  of the target, and, finally, pounces on it and kills it by suffocation. It kills small prey with a bite to the back of the neck, but holds larger animals by the throat and strangles them. It is able to take large prey due to its powerful jaw muscles, and is therefore strong enough to drag carcasses heavier than itself up into trees; an individual was seen to haul a young giraffe weighing nearly  up  into a tree. It eats small prey immediately, but drags larger carcasses over several hundred metres and caches it safely in trees, bushes or even caves; this behaviour allows the leopard to store its prey away from rivals, and offers it an advantage over them. The way it stores the kill depends on local topography and individual preferences, varying from trees in Kruger National Park to bushes in the plain terrain of the Kalahari.

In the southern Kalahari Desert, leopards meet their water requirements by the bodily fluids of prey and succulent plants; they drink water every two to three days and feed infrequently on moisture-rich plants such as gemsbok cucumbers (Acanthosicyos naudinianus), watermelon (Citrullus lanatus) and Kalahari sour grass (Schmidtia kalahariensis).

Enemies and competitors
 

In parts of its global range, the leopard is sympatric with other large predators such as the tiger (Panthera tigris), lion (P. leo), cheetah (Acinonyx jubatus), spotted hyena (Crocuta crocuta), striped hyena (Hyaena hyaena), brown hyena (Parahyaena brunnea), African wild dog (Lycaon pictus), dhole (Cuon alpinus), wolf (Canis lupus) and up to five bear species. Some of these species steal its kills, kill its cubs and even kill adult leopards. Leopards retreat up a tree in the face of direct aggression, and were observed when killing or preying on smaller competitors such as black-backed jackal, African civet (Civettictis civetta), caracal (Caracal caracal) and African wildcat (Felis lybica). Leopards generally seem to avoid encounters with adult bears, but kill vulnerable bear cubs. In Sri Lanka, a few recorded vicious fights between leopards and sloth bears (Melursus ursinus) apparently result in both animals winding up either dead or grievously injured.

While interspecies killing of full-grown leopards is generally rare, given the opportunity, both tiger and lion readily kill and consume both young and adult leopards. In the Kalahari Desert, leopards frequently lose kills to brown hyenas, if the leopard is unable to move the kill into a tree. Single brown hyenas have been observed charging at and displacing male leopards from kills. Lions occasionally fetch leopard kills from trees.

Resource partitioning occurs where leopards share their range with tigers.
In areas where leopard and tiger are sympatric, coexistence is reportedly not the general rule, with leopards being few where tigers are numerous. Tigers appear to inhabit the deep parts of a forest while leopards are pushed closer to the fringes. In tropical forests, leopards do not always avoid the larger cats by hunting at different times. With relatively abundant prey and differences in the size of prey selected, tigers and leopards seem to successfully coexist without competitive exclusion or interspecies dominance hierarchies that may be more common to the leopard's co-existence with the lion in savanna habitats.

Nile crocodiles (Crocodylus niloticus) prey on leopards occasionally. One large adult leopard was grabbed and consumed by a large crocodile while attempting to hunt along a bank in Kruger National Park. Mugger crocodiles (Crocodylus palustris) reportedly killed an adult leopard in Rajasthan. An adult leopard was recovered from the stomach of a  Burmese python (Python bivittatus). In Serengeti National Park, troops of 30–40 olive baboons (Papio anubis) were observed while mobbing and attacking a female leopard and her cubs.

Reproduction and life cycle

In some areas, leopards mate all year round. In Manchuria and Siberia, they mate during January and February. The female's estrous cycle lasts about 46 days, and she usually is in heat for 6–7 days. The generation length of the leopard is 9.3 years. Gestation lasts for 90 to 105 days. Cubs are usually born in a litter of 2–4 cubs. Mortality of cubs is estimated at 41–50% during the first year.

Females give birth in a cave, crevice among boulders, hollow tree or thicket. Cubs are born with closed eyes, which open four to nine days after birth. The fur of the young tends to be longer and thicker than that of adults. Their pelage is also more gray in colour with less defined spots. Around three months of age, the young begin to follow the mother on hunts. At one year of age, cubs can probably fend for themselves, but remain with the mother for 18–24 months.

The average typical life span of a leopard is 12–17 years. The oldest leopard was a captive female that died at the age of 24 years, 2 months and 13 days.

Conservation issues 
The leopard is listed on CITES Appendix I, and trade is restricted to skins and body parts of 2,560 individuals in 11 sub-Saharan countries. The leopard is primarily threatened by habitat fragmentation and conversion of forest to agriculturally used land, which lead to a declining natural prey base, human–wildlife conflict with livestock herders and high leopard mortality rates. It is also threatened by trophy hunting and poaching.

Between 2002 and 2012, at least four leopards were estimated to have been poached per week in India for the illegal wildlife trade of its skins and bones.
In spring 2013, 37 leopard skins were found during a 7-week long market survey in major Moroccan cities. In 2014, 43 leopard skins were detected during two surveys in Morocco. Vendors admitted to have imported skins from sub-Saharan Africa.

Surveys in the Central African Republic's Chinko area revealed that the leopard population decreased from 97 individuals in 2012 to 50 individuals in 2017. In this period, transhumant pastoralists from the border area with Sudan moved in the area with their livestock. Rangers confiscated large amounts of poison in the camps of livestock herders who were accompanied by armed merchants. They engaged in poaching large herbivores, sale of bushmeat and trading leopard skins in Am Dafok.

In Java, the leopard is threatened by illegal hunting and trade. Between 2011 and 2019, body parts of 51 Javan leopards were seized including six live individuals, 12 skins, 13 skulls, 20 canines and 22 claws.

Human interaction

Cultural significance

Leopards have featured in art, mythology and folklore of many countries. In Greek mythology, it was a symbol of the god Dionysus, who was depicted wearing leopard skin and using leopards as means of transportation. In one myth, the god was captured by pirates but two leopards rescued him. During the Benin Empire, the leopard was commonly represented on engravings and sculptures and was used to symbolise the power of the king or oba, since the leopard was considered the king of the forest. The Ashanti also used the leopard as a symbol of leadership, and only the king was permitted to have a ceremonial leopard stool. Some African cultures considered the leopard to be a smarter, better hunter than the lion and harder to kill. 

In Rudyard Kipling's "How the Leopard Got His Spots", one of his Just So Stories, a leopard with no spots in the High Veldt lives with his hunting partner, the Ethiopian. When they set off to the forest, the Ethiopian changed his brown skin, and the leopard painted spots on his skin. A leopard played an important role in the 1938 Hollywood film Bringing Up Baby. African chiefs, European queens, Hollywood actors and burlesque dancers wore coats made of leopard skins.

The leopard is a frequently used in heraldry, most commonly as passant. The heraldic leopard lacks spots and sports a mane, making it visually almost identical to the heraldic lion, and the two are often used interchangeably. Naturalistic leopard-like depictions appear on the coat of arms of Benin, Malawi, Somalia, the Democratic Republic of the Congo and Gabon, the last of which uses a black panther.

Attacks on people

The Leopard of Rudraprayag killed more than 125 people; the Panar Leopard was thought to have killed more than 400 people. Both were shot by British hunter Jim Corbett. The spotted devil of Gummalapur killed about 42 people in Karnataka, India.

In captivity
The Ancient Romans kept leopards in captivity to be slaughtered in hunts as well as be used in executions of criminals. In Benin, leopards were kept and paraded as mascots, totems and sacrifices to deities. Several leopards were kept in a menagerie established by King John of England at the Tower of London in the 13th century; around 1235, three of these animals were given to Henry III by Holy Roman Emperor Frederick II. In modern times, leopards have been trained and tamed in circuses.

See also
 
 Leopard pattern
 List of largest cats
 Panther (legendary creature)

References

Further reading

External links

 IUCN/SSC Cat Specialist Group: Panthera pardus in Africa and Panthera pardus in Asia
 

Articles containing video clips
Big cats
Felids of Africa
Felids of Asia
Mammals described in 1758
National symbols of Benin
National symbols of Malawi
National symbols of Somalia
National symbols of the Democratic Republic of the Congo
Panthera
Taxa named by Carl Linnaeus